"Talk To You Later" is a phrase that is often used as a substitute for "goodbye". 

Talk To You Later may also refer to:

 "Talk To Ya Later", a song by The Tubes on their album The Completion Backward Principle
 TTYL, an internet slang acronym of the phrase
ttyl, a 2004 novel by Lauren Myracle

See also
 
 
 See you later (disambiguation)